Uralov is a Russian masculine surname originating from the region name of Ural; its feminine counterpart is Uralova. It may refer to
Ilya Uralov (1872–1920), Russian stage actor
Mikhail Uralov, Russian anarchist
Yulen Uralov (born 1924), Soviet Olympic fencer

Russian-language surnames
Ethnonymic surnames